Penion maximus is a species of very large predatory sea snail or whelk, commonly known as giant whelk or great whelk, a marine gastropod mollusc in the family Buccinidae, the true whelks.
Their shells are highly coveted due to the intricate designs embedded in onto the shells.

Description
Penion maximus is the largest species of Penion siphon whelk, and is endemic to Australia. The species could be confused with the sympatric species P. mandarinus, however P. mandarinus is typically smaller and has a smoother shell with a shorter siphonal canal.

Distribution
The range of the species extends from waters off Tasmania and Victoria to lower Queensland.

Evolution
Penion maximus is closely related to another Australian species P. mandarinus. The species have overlapping geographic ranges (sympatry) and may have evolved from a common ancestor via niche differentiation based on prey size and water depth.

References

External links
 Molluscs of Tasmania: Buccinidae - Siphonaliinae: Penion maximus (Tryon, 1881) ('great whelk')
 Seashells of New South Wales: Penion maximus (Tryon, 1881)

Buccinidae
Gastropods of Australia
Gastropods described in 1881